The Pulpí Geode (Spanish: Geoda de Pulpí) is a giant geode found in Spain near the town of Pulpí (Province of Almería) in December 1999, by Javier Garcia-Guinea of the Grupo Mineralogista de Madrid. This geode is one of the largest documented geodes in the world to date.

The geode has a funnel shape, with the narrowest part being L-shaped. The abandoned silver-lead mine is now a geoheritage site attracting geotourists. The geode was damaged by vandals at the end of 2021, but the damage was not as severe as first thought.

The latest scientific research, on the origin of the geode, was published on 23 March 2022; the research was led by Fernando Gázquez of the University of Almeria, with the conclusion that the gypsum crystals were formed between 164 ± 15 thousand and 60 thousand years ago, in the upper Pleistocene, from a freshwater aquifer (with very little evidence of brackish or sea water, as suggested previously).

References

External links
 The Pulpí gigantic geode (Almería, Spain): geology, metal pollution, microclimatology, and conservation
 Pilar de Jaravía; La geoda gigante de la Mina Rica (in Spanish)
La Geoda de Pulpí website: https://www.geodapulpi.es/

Rocks
Geology of Spain